Batu may refer to:

Geography
Batu, East Java, a city in Indonesia
Batu Islands, an archipelago of Indonesia
Batu, Iran, a village in Razavi Khorasan Province, Iran
Batu, Kuala Lumpur, an area in Malaysia
Batu (town), Ethiopia
Batu Lintang camp, a World War II Japanese POW and civilian internee camp at Kuching, Sarawak
Batu Tara  a small isolated island in the Flores Sea
Mount Batu, Ethiopia
Batu (federal constituency), represented in the Dewan Rakyat

People
Batu (given name), a Turkic given name
Batu Khan ( – 1255), a Mongol ruler and founder of the Golden Horde
Batu (group), a Brazilian-influenced music group from London
Batu or Batupuei people in Matupi, Chin State, Myanmar (Burma)
İnal Batu (1936–2013), Turkish diplomat and politician
Osman Batur (1899-1951), Kazakh warrior who fought against the Chinese and Russians in East-Turkestan.
Pelin Batu (born 1978), Turkish actress
Saru Batu Savcı Bey (died 1287), elder brother of Osman I, the founder of the Ottoman Empire.

Trade unions
 Brotherhood of Asian Trade Unionists, former trade union federation
 Building and Allied Trades' Union, Irish trade union

Other uses
Batu, slang used in Hawaii to describe crystal methamphetamine
Batu, abbreviation for Babasaheb Ambedkar Technological University, Lonere, Raigad, Maharashtra, India
Batu, ball game of Taíno origin, similar to volleyball.
Batu, a fictional character in the book Skulduggery Pleasant: The Faceless Ones